The 2nd constituency of Oise is a French legislative constituency in the Oise département.

Description

The 2nd constituency of the Oise covers its western portion and borders Upper Normandy, it also includes the south western part of Beauvais.

Until 2017, similarly to Oise's 1st constituency the seat was a conservative stronghold since 1988 apart from the Socialist landslide at the 1997 election. At the 2012 election the vote was split by the presence of a National Front candidate in the second round but veteran Gaullist deputy Jean-François Mancel held on by less than 100 votes to claim victory.

In 2019, Agnès Thill, elected as LREM, publicly opposed a bioethics law extending to homosexual and single women free access to fertility treatments such as in vitro fertilisation (IVF) under France's national health insurance; it was one of the campaign promises of President Emmanuel Macron. She was subsequently excluded from La République en Marche and later joined the Union of Democrats and Independents.

Historic Representation

Election results

2022 

 
 
 
 
 
|-
| colspan="8" bgcolor="#E9E9E9"|
|-

2017

2012

 
 
 
 
 
|-
| colspan="8" bgcolor="#E9E9E9"|
|-

Sources
Official results of French elections from 2002: "Résultats électoraux officiels en France" (in French).

2